Irene Barclay (1894–1989), née Martin, was the first woman to qualify in England as a chartered surveyor, and was a noted campaigner for social housing.

Life
Irene Barclay was the daughter of a socialist and pacifist Congregationalist minister and the first Woman in Britain to qualify as a chartered surveyor. 

Born in Hereford, she gained a 1st class degree in History  in 1916, followed by a Diploma in Social Science, both at Bedford College, London.

Following the passage of the Sex Disqualification Removal Act 1919 she was able to sit her final exams with the College of Estate Management(now the University College of Estate Management) in 1922. Barclay was at the time of her qualification working for the Crown Estate as housing manager, managing its working class housing estates near Regent's Park.

Career
Barclay established a surveying practice with professional partner Evelyn Perry, who qualified the year after her. Barclay and Perry traded until 1940. Irene continued to practise until 1972, marking 50 years in the profession.

Although Barclay had a general surveying practice she is best known for the work her firm did for the St Pancras House Improvements Society (later St Pancras Housing Association) of which she was secretary. This was founded in Somers Town by the Anglican priest Basil Jellicoe and Barclay provided it with stability over her long tenure as its Secretary. The Association later worked elsewhere in North London and Barclay was always a consultant, never employee of the Association. Her pioneering social and housing surveys in the 1920s drew the attention of the middle classes to the plight of slum dwellers including Somers Town, Pimlico, North Kensington and Edinburgh as described in her memoirs, combining physical survey of the properites such as disrepair and lack of amenities with human aspects such as tenure, rents and overcrowding.  Barclay, who has been described as ‘Irene, the patron of the poor’,was appointed an OBE for her significant and valuable work as a social reformer.

Barclay subsequently played a leading role in the foundation of a number of housing associations in the 1920s and 1930s, including Kensington Housing Trust, Stepney Housing Trust, Isle of Dogs Housing Society and Bethnal Green Housing Society. Most of these were established on the basis of her surveys of property and housing conditions.  Barclay was also a founding member of the Association of Women Housing Workers which later merged into what is today the Chartered Institute of Housing.

Personal life
She married John Barfield Barclay (c 1897–1966), sometime staff member of the Peace Pledge Union and of International Help for Children. On retirement Barclay went to live in Canada, where she died. She is commemorated in the Somers Town Mural in Camden.  Irene Barclay was sister of Kingsley Martin, long-time editor of the New Statesman.

References

1894 births
1989 deaths
English surveyors
People educated at Haberdashers' Monmouth School for Girls
Alumni of University College of Estate Management